Barry Manilow II is the second studio album by Barry Manilow released in 1974. Propelled by the major success of its lead single "Mandy" and featuring a further international hit in "It's a Miracle", the album was a commercial breakthrough for Manilow. First issued by Bell Records, it was reissued after the company was reorganized into Arista Records. The album's success spawned a notable parody in the picture sleeve of Ray Stevens' 1979 single, "I Need Your Help Barry Manilow".

Track listing

Side 1
"I Want To Be Somebody's Baby" (Barry Manilow, Enoch Anderson) - 4:18
"Early Morning Strangers" (Barry Manilow, Hal David) - 3:24
"Mandy" (Scott English, Richard Kerr) - 3:32
"The Two of Us" (Barry Manilow, Marty Panzer) - 3:05
"Something's Comin' Up" (Barry Manilow) - 2:51

Side 2
"It's a Miracle" (Barry Manilow, Marty Panzer) - 3:58
"Avenue C" (Buck Clayton, Jon Hendricks, Dave Lambert) - 2:37
"My Baby Loves Me" (Ivy Hunter, Sylvia Moy, William "Mickey" Stevenson) - 3:18
"Sandra" (Barry Manilow, Enoch Anderson) - 4:35
"Home Again" (Barry Manilow, Marty Panzer) - 5:34

1996 Remaster
"I Want To Be Somebody's Baby"
"Early Morning Strangers"
"Mandy"
"The Two of Us"
"Something's Comin' Up"
"It's a Miracle"
"Avenue C"
"My Baby Loves Me"
"Sandra"
"Home Again"
Bonus track:
"Halfway Over the Hill"

2006 Expanded Edition
"I Want To Be Somebody's Baby"
"Early Morning Strangers"
"Mandy"
"The Two of Us"
"Something's Comin' Up"
"It's a Miracle"
"Avenue C"
"My Baby Loves Me"
"Sandra"
Home Again
Bonus tracks:
"Good News"
"Halfway Over the Hill"

Charts

Personnel
 Barry Manilow - lead vocals, backing vocals, rhythm arrangements, acoustic piano (1-6, 9, 10)
 Don Grolnick - acoustic piano (7)
 Ellen Starr - acoustic piano (8)
 Jon Stroll - clavinet (1), electric piano (2-6, 8, 9, 10)
 John Barranco - guitar (1, 6)
 Dick Frank - guitar (1, 6, 8, 9, 10)
 Bob Mann - guitar (1, 6, 10)
 Charlie Brown - guitar (2, 3, 10)
 Stuart Scharf - guitar (2, 4, 5, 8, 9, 10)
 Sam T. Brown - guitar (7)
 Will Lee - bass (1, 2, 3, 5, 6)
 Russell George - bass (4, 8, 9, 10)
 Bob Cranshaw - bass (7)
 Chris Parker - drums (1, 6)
 Jimmy Young - drums (2, 3, 5)
 Bill Lavorgna - drums (7)
 Allan Schwartzberg - drums (8, 9, 10)
 Lee Gurst - percussion (1, 6)
 Norman Pride - congas (1, 2, 5-8, 10)
 George Young - saxophone (2)
 Artie Kaplan - saxophone (6)
 Stanley Schwartz: saxophone (6)
 Jack Cortner - horn and string arrangements
 Ron Dante - backing vocals
 Melvin Kent - backing vocals (1)
 Ken Williams - backing vocals (1)
 Charlotte Crossley - backing vocals (6)
 Robin Grean - backing vocals (6)
 Sharon Redd - backing vocals (6)

Production
 Producers: Barry Manilow and Ron Dante
 Engineers: Bruce Tergesen, Harry Maslin and Michael DeLugg
 Recorded at The Hit Factory and Mediasound Recording Studios (New York City)
 Design: The Music Agency
 Front Cover Photo: Joel Brodsky
 Back Liner Photo: Linda Allen

Certifications

References

1974 albums
Barry Manilow albums
Bell Records albums
Arista Records albums
Albums produced by Ron Dante
Albums with cover art by Joel Brodsky